West Blue Mountain is the highest peak in the San Mateo Mountains of southwestern New Mexico, in the United States. It rises in the southern half of the range, far from any paved road, making access difficult and traffic on the surrounding trails very light.
Its summit is the highest point in the Apache Kid Wilderness of the Cibola National Forest.

References

External links 
 

Mountains of New Mexico
Landforms of Socorro County, New Mexico
Mountains of Socorro County, New Mexico